Frederick John Howard (1 March 1814 – 28 February 1897) was a British Member of Parliament.

Biography
Howard, born on 1 March 1814, was the eldest son of Major the Hon. Frederick Howard, third son of Frederick Howard, 5th Earl of Carlisle. His mother was Susan Lambton, daughter of William Henry Lambton. Howard was elected to the House of Commons for Youghal in 1837, a seat he held until 1841. He was also a Deputy Lieutenant for Suffolk. Howard died on 28  February 1897.

Family

Howard married Lady Fanny (December 1885), daughter of the Hon. William Cavendish, in 1837. They had five sons and three daughters. Their eldest daughter Louise (died 7 October 1871 in childbirth) married Cecil Foljambe.

References

Notes

External links 
 

1814 births
1897 deaths
Deputy Lieutenants of Suffolk
Members of the Parliament of the United Kingdom for County Cork constituencies (1801–1922)
UK MPs 1837–1841
Frederick John Howard